Mariensee is a village in Hanover Region, Lower Saxony in Germany. It is part of the town Neustadt am Rübenberge. Its population was 1,195 in April 2021.

Culture and sights 
 The Cicercian monastery "Kloster Mariensee"

References 

Former municipalities in Lower Saxony
Neustadt am Rübenberge